Piribeyler is a village in the Büyükorhan district of Bursa Province in Turkey.

The village is over 400 years old. In the beginning of the 17th Century the village had Christian inhabitants. In the child levy of the winter between 1603-1604, teenagers were levied into the Devshirme system.

References

Villages in Büyükorhan District